Digitaria longiflora is a species of crabgrass. It is the wild progenitor of the West African domesticated crop Digitaria exilis.

References

External links

African Plant Database

longiflora
Grasses of Africa